The Russian Presidential Academy of National Economy and Public Administration (RANEPA) is a federal state-funded institution of higher  education located in Moscow, Russia.

With the merger of ANE, RAPA, 12 other regional civil service academies in 2010, the newly formed Russian Presidential Academy became one of the larger socioeconomic and humanities universities in Russia and Europe.

The academy consists of 22 faculties, had 55 branches, and includes the Graduate School of Corporate Management (President – acad. Abel Aganbegyan) and delivers professional degree programs including 113 bachelor's programs, 11 specialist programs, nearly 150 master's programs and 7 vocational/associate degree programs. It is a Consultative body under the Government of Russian Federation.

History
The Academy of National Economy under the Government of the Russian Federation was established in 1977. It provided business and educational programs and trained civil servants, entrepreneurs, financiers, and lawyers. By 2010 it produced over 100,000 graduates, among them presidents of post-soviet countries, prime ministers and famous businessmen (including Sergey Kiriyenko and Alexey Gordeyev). Today the academy constitutes a research and educational complex that realizes a continuous education model of higher education and postgraduate training, as well as tailored professional training.

In 1995 with its Resolution, the Russian Government granted the academy with the official status of the leading educational, methodological and research center in the system of training and qualification upgrading of the federal and regional civil servants, as well as the leading educational institution that carries out training of specialists in the area of the higher professional, postgraduate and complementary training. In 2010 by the decree of the Russian President, the Russian Academy of Public Administration as well as some regional universities joined ANE to form the Russian Presidential Academy of National Economy and Public Administration. Academy holds membership with international education associations, including IAU, AACSB, CEEMAN. MBA and DBA programs of some of its divisions are accredited by the Association of MBAs (AMBA). The leading institution among existed ones in RANEPA is IBS (Institute of business study). Today, IBS-Moscow is the major school of business.

People affiliated with the academy

 Abel Aganbegyan
 German Gref
 Santiago Iñiguez de Onzoño
 Paul Judge
 Manfred F.R. Kets de Vries
 Andrey Korotkov
 Laurence Kotlikoff
 Vladimir Lisin
 Yekaterina Shulman
 Dmitry Shumkov
 Aleksei Shaposhnikov
 Olga Vasilieva
 Alina Zagitova
 Tatyana Zaslavskaya

See also
 List of Business Schools in Europe

References

External links

 

 
Business schools in Russia
Universities in Moscow
Educational institutions established in 1977
1977 establishments in the Soviet Union
Economics schools